ε Gruis, Latinised as Epsilon Gruis, is a blue-white hued star in the southern constellation of Grus. It is visible to the naked eye, having an apparent visual magnitude of 3.5. Based upon an annual parallax shift of 25.30 mas as measured from Earth, it is located around 129 light years from the Sun. The system may be moving closer to the Sun with a radial velocity of about −0.4 km/s.

This is an A-type subgiant of spectral type A2IVn, a star that has used up its core hydrogen and has begun to expand off the main sequence. At the estimated age of 249 million years, it is spinning rapidly with a projected rotational velocity of 235 km/s. This is giving the star an oblate shape with an equatorial bulge that is an estimated 18% larger than the polar radius. The star displays an infrared excess, suggesting the presence of a circumstellar disk of orbiting dust.

References

A-type subgiants
Circumstellar disks
Grus (constellation)
Gruis, Epislon
Durchmusterung objects
112623
112623
8675